Zanetta Rosa Benozzi Balletti (27 June 1701, in Toulouse – 16 September 1758), known under her stage name Silvia Balletti, was an Italian actress. She was active at the Troupe de Regente of Luigi Riccoboni at the Comédie-Italienne in Paris 1716–1758.
She was the star of the Italian theatre in Paris and regarded as a superior interpreter of the plays by Pierre de Marivaux. She mainly played the part of heroine in Commedia dell'arte, Silvia. Casanova belonged to her admirers.

Life
Silvia Balletti was born to the Italian actors Giuseppe Tortoriti (Pascariello), Antonio Benozzi and Clara Mascara, who belonged to a Venetian theatre company active in Toulouse since the banishment of the Comédie Italienne from Paris in 1697. In 1716, she belonged to the first actors engaged when the Comedie Italienne was reestablished in Paris. Her career up to that point is not known, but it is presumed that she must have had experience, since she would not otherwise have been hired to take part in the opening performance before the regent of 18 May 1716. She made a success, and became the theater's star in heroine parts.

In 1720, she began a long co-operation with Pierre de Marivaux, who wrote numerous plays for her in which she celebrated triumphs on stage. Among her celebrated parts were the main parts i Le Jeu de l'amour et du hasard (1730),  L'amante difficile (1731), Le Je ne sais quoi (1731), L'École des mères (1732), Arlequin apprenti philosophe (1733). Until his death in 1739, she mainly acted opposite Tommaso Visentini, thereafter opposite Antonio Costantini. Though she eventually replaced the parts as heroine for mother-roles, she remained one of the most celebrated actors of Paris until her retirement, and was in 1754 still referred to as a renowned perfect actor.  
Silvia Balletti retired in February 1758, shortly before her death.

In 1720, she married her cousin Giuseppe Balletti, who was her co-actor in hero-parts. In 1750, she met Casanova, who was the friend of her son Antonio Stefano Balletti and courted her daughter Manon.

Bibliography
 
 
 
  Micheline Boudet, La Comédie Italienne, Marivaux et Silvia, Paris, Albin Michel, 2001. 
  Émile Campardon Les Comédiens du roi de la troupe française pendant des deux derniers siècles; documents inédits recueillis aux archives nationales 1880. Paris, Berger-Levrault et C.ie Éditeurs.
  Jacques Casanova de Seingalt – Histoire de ma vie. Texte intégral du manuscrit original, suivi de textes inédits. Édition présentée et établie par Francis Lacassin.. Ed. Robert Laffont. 1993.
  Benedetta Craveri (a cura di) Lettere di Mademoiselle Aïssé a Madame C…Adelphi 1984  (pag. 41 e Regesto pag. 242).
  Georges Cucuel La Pouplinière et la musique de chambre au XVIII siècle. Paris, Librairie Fischbacher, Rue de Seine, 33 1913. 
  Xavier de Courville, Un apôtre de l'art du théâtre au XVIII siècle Luigi Riccoboni, dit Lélio. Tome III (1732–1753). Librairie Théatrale, Paris, 1958.
  Edmond e Jules de Goncourt La donna nel XVIII secolo. (Pag. 342 nota 9, pag. Ed. Sellerio 2010).
  Antoine d'Origny, Annales du Théâtre Italien depuis son origine jusqu'à ce jour, dédiées au Roi par M. D'Origny, Paris, Veuve Duchesne, 1788, 3 voll.
  Antoine de Léris Dictionnaire portatif des théâtres l'origine des différens théâtres de Paris, Paris 1754.
  Emanuele De Luca, «Io Rinasco». Storia e repertorio della nouvelle Comédie Italienne Tesi di Laurea, Università degli Studi di Firenze, Facoltà di Lettere e Filosofia, 2006–2007, 2 voll.
  Desboulmiers:   Histoire anecdotique et raisonnée du Théâtre-Italien Paris 1769 
  Charles Simon Favart, Théâtre de M. Favart, ou Recueil Des Comédies, Parodies & Opéra-Comiques qu'il a donnés jusqu'à ce jour, Paris, Duchesne, 1763, 8 voll.

  Geneviève Dubois-Kervran, L'acte de baptême de Silvia in Dix-Huitième Siècle, SFEDS n°35 2003 
 
  François et Claude Parfaict, Histoire de l'Ancien Théâtre Italien, depuis son origine en France jusqu'à sa suppression en l'Année 1697. Suivie des extraits ou canevas des meilleures Pièces Italiennes qui n'ont jamais été imprimées, Paris, Rozet, 1767.
  Camille Pascal, Le goût du roi: Louis XV et Marie-Louise O'Murphy, Paris, Librairie Académique Perrin, 2006, 
  Aldo Ravà (a cura di), Lettere di donne a G. Casanova, Milano, Fratelli Treves, 1912.
  Charles Samaran, Jacques Casanova, Vénitien, une vie d'aventurier au XVIII siècle, Parigi, Calmann-Lévy, 1914.

References

1701 births
1758 deaths
18th-century Italian actresses
Actresses from Toulouse
Commedia dell'arte
Expatriate actresses in France
Italian stage actresses
Actresses from Paris